The 13th Primorsko-Goranska Assault Division was a Yugoslav Partisan division formed in Brinje on 19 April 1943. On the day of its formation it consisted of 1,986 soldiers in two brigades: the 6th and 14th Primorsko-Goranska Brigades. Commander of the brigade was Veljko Kovačević while its political commissar was Josip Skočilić. The division mostly operated in the regions of Croatian Littoral and Gorski Kotar. In January 1944, the division became part of the 11th Corps. By the end of the war the division grew in size to around 5,600 soldiers.

Notes

References 

Divisions of the Yugoslav Partisans
Military units and formations established in 1943